Parvicardium is a genus of bivalves belonging to the subfamily Lymnocardiinae of the family Cardiidae. 

The genus has an almost cosmopolitan distribution.

Species
 †Parvicardium benoisti 
Parvicardium carrozzai 
Parvicardium exiguum 
Parvicardium hauniense 
Parvicardium mikii 
Parvicardium pinnulatum 
Parvicardium scabrum 
Parvicardium scriptum 
Parvicardium simile 
Parvicardium sonense 
Parvicardium trapezium 
Parvicardium triangulatum 
Parvicardium vroomi 
Species brought into synonymy
 † Parvicardium brykense Goncharova & Zhgenti, 1989: synonym of † Chokrakia brykense (Goncharova & Zhgenti, 1989) 
 Parvicardium elegantulum (Møller, 1842): synonym of Goethemia elegantula (Møller, 1842)
 Parvicardium nodosum W. Turton, 1822 non Montagu, 1803: synonym of Parvicardium scabrum (Philippi, 1844) 
 Parvicardium ovale (G. B. Sowerby II, 1840): synonym of Parvicardium pinnulatum (Conrad, 1831)
 Parvicardium ovale (G. B. Sowerby II, 1840) sensu Spada & Della Bella, 1990: synonym of Parvicardium scriptum (Bucquoy, Dautzenberg & Dollfus, 1892)
 Parvicardium papillosum (Poli, 1791): synonym of Papillicardium papillosum (Poli, 1791)
 Parvicardium suezensis Issel, 1869: synonym of Fragum sueziense (Issel, 1869)
 Parvicardium transclathratum (Viader, 1951): synonym of Fragum sueziense (Issel, 1869)
 Parvicardium turtoni (G.B. Sowerby III, 1894): synonym of Papillicardium turtoni (G. B. Sowerby III, 1894)

References

 MolluscaBase eds. (2021). MolluscaBase. Parvicardium Monterosato, 1884. Accessed through: World Register of Marine Species at: http://marinespecies.org/aphia.php?p=taxdetails&id=137739 on 2021-12-16
 Lambiotte M. (1979). Note sur les petites espèces européennes récentes de la famille des Cardiidae rapportées aux genres Parvicardium T.A. Monterosato, 1884 et Papillicardium F. Sacco, 1899, et description d'un genre nouveau, Balticardium gen. nov.. Informations de la Société Belge de Malacologie 7(2): 39-47
 Gofas, S.; Le Renard, J.; Bouchet, P. (2001). Mollusca. in: Costello, M.J. et al. (eds), European Register of Marine Species: a check-list of the marine species in Europe and a bibliography of guides to their identification. Patrimoines Naturels. 50: 180-213

External links
 Monterosato, T. A. di. (1884). Nomenclatura generica e specifica di alcune conchiglie mediterranee. Virzi, printed for the Author, Palermo, 152 pp
 Gofas, S.; Le Renard, J.; Bouchet, P. (2001). Mollusca. in: Costello, M.J. et al. (eds), European Register of Marine Species: a check-list of the marine species in Europe and a bibliography of guides to their identification. Patrimoines Naturels. 50: 180-213
 Poorten, J.J. ter, 2005. Outline of a systematic index - Recent Cardiidae (Lamarck, 1809). VISAYA net
 Crosse H. (1885). Nomenclatura generica e specifica di alcune conchiglie mediterranee, pel Marchese di Monterosato [book review. Journal de Conchyliologie 33: 139-142]

Cardiidae
Bivalve genera